Actinopsis is a monotypic genus of cnidarians belonging to the family Actiniidae. The only species is Actinopsis flava.

The species is found in Europe.

References

Actiniidae